Richlands Historic District is a national historic district located at Richlands, Onslow County, North Carolina.  The district encompasses 90 contributing buildings, 2 contributing structures, and 2 contributing objects in the central business district and surrounding residential sections of Richlands.  The district largely developed after 1880 and includes notable examples of Late Victorian and I-house style residential architecture. Notable contributing buildings include the Robert D. Thompson House (1908), Daniel Webster Murrill House (1908), the Del Barbee House (1910), the Edwards-Cox House (1915), Isaac Koonce House (1918), George Brooks House (1915), Franck House (1914), Richlands Theater (1936), J. F. Mohn Building (1936), Richlands Supply Company Building (1905), M. B. Steed Store (1911), Peoples Bank Building (c. 1904), Bank of Richlands (1927), First Baptist Church (1920s), and Richlands United Methodist Church (1939).

It was listed on the National Register of Historic Places in 1990.

References

Historic districts on the National Register of Historic Places in North Carolina
Victorian architecture in North Carolina
Buildings and structures in Onslow County, North Carolina
National Register of Historic Places in Onslow County, North Carolina